"Biscuits" is a song recorded by American country music artist Kacey Musgraves that serves as the lead single from her second major label studio album, Pageant Material. It was released to country radio on March 16, 2015, through Mercury Nashville and was released to digital retailers the following day. The song was written and produced by Musgraves and Shane McAnally, with additional songwriting by Brandy Clark and additional production by Luke Laird. In December 2015, Billboard ranked "Biscuits" number one on its "10 Best Country Songs of 2015" list and number 16 on its list of the 25 best songs of 2015 across all genres.

Despite its official release date of March 16, "Biscuits" was tied for the tenth most-added song at American country radio for the week of March 9, 2015, and as a result debuted on the Billboard Country Airplay chart that week at number 56.

Content
"Biscuits" is a mid-tempo country song with lyrics revolving around individualism and minding one's own business. The song was written by Musgraves, Shane McAnally, and Brandy Clark, the same songwriting team behind her 2013 hit "Follow Your Arrow", which numerous critics have noted is similar to "Biscuits". UK music blog The Guardian noted the song's effective use of language and imagery to get its message across "about what it means truly to blaze your own trail in spite of others' judgment" and Musgraves' everyperson appeal. "Musgraves has a way of making people feel special," writes Grady Smith, "not by telling them that they’re special, but by reminding them that no one really is."

Music video
The music video was directed by Marc Klasfeld and premiered in June 2015. The video was nominated for Music Video of the Year at the 2015 CMA Awards.

Critical reception
Billboard ranked "Biscuits" at number 16 on its year-end list for 2015: "Musgraves, who many have compared to a modern-day Loretta Lynn, scored a triumphant note with this banjo-backed warning to keep out of other people's business. As usual, it's done in her tell-it-like-you-see-it style."

Accolades

Chart performance
"Biscuits" debuted at number 56 on the Billboard Country Airplay chart for the week ending March 21, 2015.  Two weeks later, after its release for sale, it debuted at number 22 on the Bubbling Under Hot 100 and number 28 on the Hot Country Songs for charts dated April 4, 2015, and sold 25,000 copies in its debut week. The song has sold 117,000 copies in the US as of June 2015.

Charts

Weekly charts

Year-end charts

Certifications

Release history

References

2015 songs
2015 singles
Kacey Musgraves songs
Mercury Nashville singles
Songs written by Kacey Musgraves
Songs written by Shane McAnally
Songs written by Brandy Clark
Song recordings produced by Luke Laird
Music videos directed by Marc Klasfeld
Song recordings produced by Shane McAnally